The Mantellidae are a family of the order Anura. These frogs are endemic to the islands of Madagascar and Mayotte.

Systematics
The family Mantellidae is composed of three extremely ecologically diverse groups of frogs, divided into three subfamilies: the Mantellinae Laurent, 1946 are typically terrestrial or semi-aquatic frogs; the Laliostominae Vences & Glaw, 2001 are terrestrial, typically fairly large-sized frogs; and the Boophinae Vences & Glaw, 2001 are arboreal tree frogs.

Apart from the genera assigned to the three subfamilies, the placement of Tsingymantis Glaw, Hoegg & Vences, 2006 is still uncertain.

As of 22 September 2022, 237 species are recognized in this family. DNA barcoding research has shown however that more than 100 distinct genetic lineages remain taxonomically undescribed.

Evolution and island biogeography
The Mantellidae are Madagascar's most diverse frog family. It has been shown that there is a negative correlation between body size and species diversity in this family, which is probably related to the lower dispersal potential of smaller animals. This family is estimated to have colonized the island of Madagascar 76–87 million years ago. They are phylogenetically nested within Asian frogs, and therefore probably represent a dispersal event from Asia.

Two undescribed species of mantellid frogs are currently resident on the island of Mayotte, off Madagascar's west coast. These species belong to two genera that are otherwise exclusively endemic to Madagascar.

Reproduction
Reproductive modes in the Mantellidae are highly varied. Eggs can be laid in or out of water, on the ground or on leaves, depending on genus and species. Guibemantis frogs of the subgenus Pandanusicola lay their eggs either in phytotelms or over slow-flowing water. Some species of Gephyromantis have direct development or nidicolous tadpoles. Members of the subfamilies Boophinae and Laliostominae have amplexus, but mantelline frogs do not. Parental care is known from a few species (e.g. Mantidactylus argenteus). Sexual size dimorphism is present in most species, with females being larger than males, but there are exceptions (e.g. Boophis albilabris), where males are larger than females, possibly as a result of males fighting for access to females.

In captivity
Some members of this family are popular in the exotic pet trade for their bright colors (e.g. Mantella and Boophis).

References

External links  
  Description of family and list of genera and species 
  Mantellidae taxonomy

 
Taxa named by Raymond Laurent
Amphibian families